Desolation Angels is a 1982 Australian film about three high school students who borrow a weekender house in Portsea and are terrorised by some thugs.

It was shot in March and April 1982.

The title is a reference to a novel written by Beat Generation author Jack Kerouac.

References

External links
 
 Desolation Angels at Oz Movies
 

Australian thriller drama films
1980s English-language films
1982 films
1982 thriller films
1980s Australian films